Kolakomban is a 1983 Indian Malayalam-language film directed and produced by J. Sasikumar. The film stars Mohanlal, M. G. Soman, Manavalan Joseph, Menaka and Prathapachandran. The film features a musical score by Johnson.

Plot

Cast

Mohanlal as Gopi
M. G. Soman as Khalid
Manavalan Joseph
Menaka
Prathapachandran
Alummoodan as Mathai
C. I. Paul as Unnithan 
Mala Aravindan
Rajeshwari
T. G. Ravi as Velu
Varalakshmi

Soundtrack
The music was composed by Johnson and the lyrics were written by A. D. Rajan.

References

External links
 

1983 films
1980s Malayalam-language films